Wolnosc i Sprawiedliwosc (Freedom and Justice, WiS) was a secret Polish oppositional, anti-Communist organization, founded in early 1950s in Warsaw and Kraków. Its creators were former activists of Wolnosc i Niezawislosc (WiN), who wanted to distance themselves from late WiN structures, which were filled with Urząd Bezpieczeństwa agents.

See also

 Cursed soldiers
 1951 Mokotów Prison execution

Political organisations based in Poland
Organizations established in the 1950s
1950s establishments in Poland